Syndicate is an unincorporated community in Clinton Township, Vermillion County, in the U.S. state of Indiana.

History
According to Ronald L. Baker, Syndicate probably took its name from a nearby mine.

Geography

References

Unincorporated communities in Vermillion County, Indiana
Unincorporated communities in Indiana
Terre Haute metropolitan area